The R241 road is a regional road in the north-west of Ireland. It is a coastal road on the eastern side of Inishowen, a peninsula in the north of County Donegal in Ulster. The road forms part of the Wild Atlantic Way. Part of the road is on the Inishowen Head Loop walking trail.

The R241 travels northeast from the R238 at Moville. The road travels along the western shore of Lough Foyle via Greencastle before ending near Inishowen Head at Shrove. The Shrove Lighthouses are located here. Originally built in the late 1830s, only the West Lighthouse remains operational.

See also
Roads in Ireland

References

Regional roads in the Republic of Ireland
Roads in County Donegal